The AFL Women's Rising Star is an Australian rules football award given annually to the best young player in the AFL Women's (AFLW) for the year. Two eligible players are nominated each round of the home-and-away season; the players must have been under 21 at the beginning of the year and cannot have been previously nominated. Players suspended during the year cannot win. After the season's completion, an expert panel votes on the recipient.

National Australia Bank continued its sponsorship of the award in 2018, offering $20,000 in prize money. The winner was announced at the AFLW's awards ceremony on 27 March, held at Peninsula, an event space in Docklands, Melbourne, and live-streamed on AFL.com.au. The ten members of the voting panel were Australian Football League (AFL) officials Nicole Livingstone, who served as the chair, Steve Hocking, Josh Vanderloo and Grant Williams; AFL Victoria's Darren Flanigan; Tim Harrington of the AFL Players Association (AFLPA); 's Peta Searle; and media commentators Sharelle McMahon, Kelli Underwood and Shelley Ware.

Molloy also won the AFLPA's inaugural award for the AFLW's best first-year player, as voted by her peers; was named Collingwood's best and fairest overall and best first-year player; finished equal-second in the AFLW best and fairest behind Emma Kearney; and was named in the back pocket of the All-Australian team. The  accrued the most nominations during the season, with five players (Libby Birch, Monique Conti, Naomi Ferres, Bonnie Toogood and Aisling Utri) selected.

Nominations

Final voting

See also
2018 AFL Rising Star

References

2018 AFL Women's season
Lists of AFL Women's players